EHF Euro 2020 may refer to:
2020 European Men's Handball Championship
2020 European Women's Handball Championship